Gordon Wharton (born in 1929, in High Wycombe, Buckinghamshire), died  2 December 2011 (http://richardawarren.wordpress.com/back-from-oblivion-tracking-the-poetry-of-gordon-wharton/ ) was a British poet.

He left school aged 14 and said that anything he learned afterwards was self-taught. He
started publishing poems from the age of about 21 and he became co-editor of the now-defunct
literary magazine Chanticleer with the Irish poet, Patrick Galvin, at around the same time.
Shortly afterwards he started reviewing regularly for the Times Literary Supplement, mainly
dealing with modern and 17th-century poetry.

He listed among the prime influences on his work Dylan Thomas, Andrew Marvell
and ("inevitably") W.H. Auden. More recently, as may be evident from
some of his later poems, the more economical style of Ian Hamilton has been
an influence. Meanwhile, in his more prosaic working life, he graduated from
carpentry, via work on a travelling fair and a period dealing in antiques, to travel
journalism; in fact he was founder-editor of the weekly Travelnews,
a newspaper serving the travel industry.

He published two small collections of verse in the mid to late 1950s:  This and That (Fantasy Press 1955) and Errors of Observation (The School of Art, University of Reading 1957)  and  issue number 8 of The Poet magazine in 1954 was devoted entirely to his poems.

He started submitting poetry for publication after a break of some 30 years.  He has been published more recently in literary magazines such as Ambit (http://www.poetrymagazines.org.uk/magazine/record.asp?id=7502), London Magazine and The Rialto. His third volume,  Towards Oblivion, was published shortly before his death. http://www.gordonwharton.co.uk

1929 births
Living people
English male poets